Wilson Elementary School may refer to:

 California
 Wilson Elementary School (San Bernardino, California)
 Wilson Elementary School (Santa Ana, California) - Santa Ana Unified School District
 Wilson Elementary School (Stockton, California)
 Oregon
 Wilson Elementary School (Medford, Oregon)
 Tennessee
 Wilson Elementary School (Allred, Tennessee)
 Wilson Elementary School (Crawford, Tennessee)
 Wilson Elementary School (Ivyton, Tennessee)
 Wilson Elementary School (Murfreesboro, Tennessee)
 Texas
 Baker Montessori School, formerly Woodrow Wilson Elementary School and Woodrow Wilson Montessori School (Houston) - Houston Independent School District
 Wilson Elementary School, formerly Wilson Intermediate School, in unincorporated Harris County, Texas - Aldine Independent School District
 Peggy Wilson Elementary School in unincorporated Harris County, Texas - Cypress-Fairbanks Independent School District
 Virginia
 Wilson Elementary School (Fishersville, Virginia)
 Wisconsin
 Wilson Elementary School (Sheboygan, Wisconsin)
 Wilson Elementary School (West Allis, Wisconsin)
 Ohio
 Wilson Elementary School (Cincinnati, Ohio)